NGC 4402 is a relatively near, edge-on spiral galaxy located around 50 million light-years from Earth. It is in the constellation of Virgo within the Virgo Cluster of galaxies. It can be seen when viewing Markarian's Chain.

NGC 4402 is roughly 55 thousand light-years wide and is moving away from Earth at around 232 kilometers per second. It is falling into the Virgo galaxy cluster. Images show evidence that the material it once contained to enable it to form stars has been stripped away in a process known as "ram-pressure stripping". This is due to NGC 4402's cooler gasses being struck by hot x-ray gasses coming from the middle of the Virgo galaxy cluster as it moves toward it. The evidence is as follows:

There is apparent truncation of the NGC 4402's dust disk.
An upward bowing of the dusty disk is apparent. This is caused by a wind of hot gas.
Light coming from the far side of the stellar disk appears dim and reddish. This may be because pressure coming from the cluster gas is being forced between the disk and the observer.
The bottom part of the main disk shows dust in the form of linear filaments. These are being ablated in a characteristic "outside-in" manner.

The supernova SN 1976B was observed in NGC 4402 in 1976.

NGC 4402 will likely transition into a Jellyfish galaxy as it falls further towards the center of the galaxy cluster. GALEX observations of the galaxy do not appear to show trailing gas, dust and star formation streamers extending from the disc, indicating that the galaxy has likely begun to feel the effects of the ram pressure stripping only recently. NGC 4402 will likely lose a significant fraction of its star formation material to this process, rendering it an Anemic galaxy.

Gallery

References

Further reading

 
 
  

Spiral galaxies
Virgo (constellation)
Virgo Cluster
4402
07528
040644